Operation Hydrant is a British police investigation into allegations of "non-recent" child sexual abuse. It co-ordinates a number of other investigations by police forces throughout the United Kingdom. It is headed by Simon Bailey, the Chief Constable of Norfolk Constabulary. It began after the Jimmy Savile sexual abuse scandal prompted more complainants to come forward.

Progress
In May 2015, Operation Hydrant had information on "1433 suspects of which 216 are deceased, 666 suspects related to institutions, 261 classified as people of public prominence, [of which] 506 are classified as unidentified, [and] 357 institutions have been identified within the scope of the operation".

By December 2015, there were 2,228 suspects under investigation by Operation Hydrant, of whom 302 are classified as of "public prominence", (including 99 politicians and 147 celebrities from the media), and 1,217 operated within institutions (including 86 religious institutions, 39 medical establishments, 25 prisons/young offenders institutes, 22 sports venues, 10 community institutions, 81 other institutions such as guest houses, and 6 unknown). 286 were dead, and 554 classified as unknown or unidentified. Of the prominent suspects, 39 were from the music industry and 17 from the world of sport.

In July 2019, the BBC reported: "Some 7,396 possible crimes on its database have now had a final outcome. Of those 2,043 - or 29% - ended in a conviction."

Operation Winter Key
Operation Winter Key was set up by the Metropolitan Police (Met) in Greater London in June 2015 and absorbed earlier Met operations, including Operation Yewtree and Operation Fairbank. Allegations referred to the Met by Operation Hydrant are handled by Winter Key. By March 2019 Winter Key had cost £20 million.

Figures released in February 2020
In February 2020 the following statistics relating to allegations of abuse were released:

Since the launch of the operation, some 7,000 suspects have been identified, with 11,346 allegations of attacks from 9,343 victims. Some allegations date back to the 1940s and all concerned child sexual abuse.

Allegations where no further action was taken were broken down into the following percentages:

Chief Constable Simon Bailey said: "We are now having to come to terms, as a society, and we are going to have to recognise and accept, that during the 1970s and 1980s in particular, there was widespread sexual abuse of children taking place." He also said "These allegations and the vast majority of cases were never reported to the authorities. Some victims did not think they were going to be believed. There was one constant factor: there was an abuse of power … to satisfy their sexual desires." Regarding the scale of the crimes he said "There was an epidemic of it in the 1970s and 1980s. We do not understand the true scale of it. There is a lot to come out. There are a lot more victims who are yet to come forward." Regarding the impact of abuse he said "The really difficult thing to come to terms with is the untold damage that’s been done to victims and survivors. Some could not cope. It’s the toll that it has taken on their lives. Some victims committed suicide. Some coped, some are in the mental care system. The horrors bestowed on these children are horrific."

Gabrielle Shaw of the National Association for People Abused in Childhood said "We know from what victims and survivors tell us that being able to report what happened to the police is healing for many people, sometimes even when a case cannot be pursued. Thirty-five percent of offenders brought to justice for non-recent abuse is very encouraging."

External links 
 Operation Hydrant on the NPCC site

References 

Child sexual abuse in the United Kingdom
H
Operation Yewtree
Sex crimes in the United Kingdom